Sandweiss is a German surname, Sand means sand and weiss - white. Notable people with the surname include:

Ellen Sandweiss (born 1958), American actress
Martha A. Sandweiss, American historian

German-language surnames